Meet the Deedles is a 1998 American comedy film directed by Steve Boyum in his directorial debut, and starring Paul Walker, Steve Van Wormer, A. J. Langer, John Ashton, Robert Englund, and Dennis Hopper. This was the first live-action film from DIC Entertainment.

Released theatrically by Buena Vista Pictures in the United States on March 27, 1998, the film received largely negative reviews from critics. It was also a box office bomb, grossing only $4.4 million against a $24 million budget.

Plot
Fraternal twin brothers Phil (Walker) and Stew (Van Wormer) Deedle live in Hawaii and enjoy a life of leisure living off of their father Elton’s (Braeden) hard earned wealth. After they are reported truant from school so they could enjoy a surf session on their 18th birthday, the school expels them. Frustrated with their laziness Elton enrolls them in a boot camp at Yellowstone National Park, to the horror of the boys.

Arriving on the mainland, they learn that the bootcamp has been shuttered due to lawsuits and the former owner, Major Flowers (Gainey), intends to give them survival training on his own. En route to their camp he accidentally drives them over a cliff, ejecting them from the vehicle. Believing he killed the brothers, Flowers disappears into the forest. Phil and Stew steal clothing from a nearby campsite and proceed downhill by luge to the nearby ranger station. After a collision with the park sign, the responding park rangers misidentify the brothers by the names “Mel” and “Mo” written on clothing tags that they took earlier.

The brothers awaken in the hospital and assume the identities they had been given, learning that Mel and Mo were expected by the station as two highly-touted naturalist recruits to the National Park Service. As they adjust to life at Yellowstone, they struggle to adopt Mel and Mo’s apparent foraging lifestyle, while also feebly attempting to accomplish their job as best as they can. Along the way, Phil develops a mutual attraction with Jesse (Langer), a Lieutenant at the station and the stepdaughter of the park’s commanding ranger Captain Pine (Ashton), earning both the brothers Pine’s ire.

Eventually the brothers discover that a disgruntled former park ranger, Frank Slater (Hopper), has masterminded a plan to divert the hydrologic process of Old Faithful through a series of underground pipes into an extinct geyser on land that he owns, ultimately creating a new park that would rival Yellowstone. Slater intends to implement his plan during an anniversary celebration for Old Faithful in hopes that he publicly humiliates Pine in the process.

Later the real Mel (Gasteyer) and Mo (Cavanagh) arrive at the ranger station after being waylaid by various mishaps, and they expose the Deedles as imposters. This upsets Jesse and Captain Pine, leading to the brother's expulsion from the park. Despite this, they still set out to stop Slater from going through with his plan and attempt to infiltrate his base. When they parachute onto his land, they are immediately taken underground to Slater. There, with the help of a prairie dog they befriended earlier, they don protective heat suits and halt the diversion of superheated water to Slater’s geyser "New Faithful" and restore Old Faithful. This causes a reaction that creates an explosion on Slater’s land, creating a natural wave pool where visitors can surf.

Slater and his henchmen are arrested for their crimes, Phil reconciles with Jesse and the brothers are reinstated into the Park Service. Elton arrives and expresses his pride in their accomplishments, and the brothers along with Jesse go surfing in the newly-created park attraction.

Cast
 Paul Walker as Phil Deedle
 Steve Van Wormer as Stew Deedle
 A. J. Langer as Lieutenant Jesse Ryan
 John Ashton as Captain Douglas Pine
 Robert Englund as Nemo
 Dennis Hopper as Frank Slater
 Eric Braeden as Elton Deedle
 Richard Lineback as Crabbe
 M. C. Gainey as Major Ed Flowers
 Ana Gasteyer as Mel
 Megan Cavanagh as Mo
 Hattie Winston as Jo-Claire
 Bart the Bear as Circus Bear
 Tai (elephant) as Circus Elephant
 Josef the Lion as Circus Lion

The film also features cameos from former Oingo Boingo members Steve Bartek, Johnny "Vatos" Hernandez, Carl Graves, and Sam "Sluggo" Phipps as the band at the luau.

The film marked the last feature film appearance of the original Bart the Bear, who became ill in 1998 and died in 2000. He was trained by Heber City, Utah's Wasatch Rocky Mountain Wildlife employees.

Production
In May 1997, Paul Walker and Steve Van Wormer were cast to play the fraternal twin Deedle brothers directed by Steve Boyum from a script by Jim Herzfeld. The film was the first production from DIC Films in its production deal with Disney after DIC recently started a live-action feature division with the Disney deal. Disney agreed to distribute the film domestically as a negative pickup with Quadra handling foreign rights.

Reception
Reviews for the film were unanimously bad, claiming the film was nothing more than a poor attempt to revive the goofball duo genre of films, like Bill & Ted's Excellent Adventure, Wayne's World, and Dumb and Dumber. Areas of the film that drew the most criticism were its two-dimensional characters, overuse of surfer slang, ludicrous plot, and questionable morals. The film has since gone out of print, though it is available for streaming on Disney+ and Amazon Prime as of August 2020.

On Rotten Tomatoes the film has an approval rating of 7% based on reviews from 28 critics. The site's consensus states: "Audiences will be eager to lose The Deedles' number after suffering through this obnoxiously unfunny surfer comedy".

Box office
The movie was a box office bomb, only grossing $4.4 million against a $24 million budget.

Soundtrack
The original music for the film was composed by former Oingo Boingo member Steve Bartek. Most of the songs featured on the soundtrack were from third-wave ska bands, as the genre was at the peak of its popularity at the time of the film's release. Notably, Weezer frontman Rivers Cuomo's band Homie had their only officially released song "American Girls" on the soundtrack.

 "Wrong Thing Right Then" - The Mighty Mighty Bosstones
 "Lady Luck" - Dance Hall Crashers
 "Seems Like Yesterday" - Goldfinger
 "Dr. Bones" - Cherry Poppin' Daddies
 "I Can't Wait" - Hepcat
 "Psycho Gremmie" - Gary Hoey
 "For You" - Save Ferris
 "Go Where You Go" - Geggy Tah
 "Failing and Leaving" - Radish
 "American Girls" - Homie
 "Hawaii Five-O" - Perfect Thyroid
 "Who Are Those Guys?" - Steve Bartek

References

External links
 
 

1998 films
1990s buddy comedy films
American buddy comedy films
DIC Entertainment films
Films directed by Steve Boyum
Films scored by Steve Bartek
Films set in Wyoming
American surfing films
Walt Disney Pictures films
1998 directorial debut films
1998 comedy films
1990s English-language films
1990s American films
1990s French films
Films set in the Yellowstone National Park